Balonga is a genus of flowering plants belonging to the family Annonaceae.

Its native range is Western Central Tropical Africa.

Species:

Balonga buchholzii

References

Annonaceae
Annonaceae genera